MV Danica Joy was a passenger ferry owned and operated by Aleson Shipping Lines. She served the BIMP-EAGA Route of Zamboanga City - Sandakan, Sabah, Malaysia.

Career
MV Danica Joy was a passenger ship of Aleson Shipping Lines that serves the BIMP-EAGA Route of Zamboanga City - Sandakan, Sabah, Malaysia. Originally, her namesake is MV Danica Joy 2 as per records given from Maritime Industry Authority, and through Maritime Connector as she's the successor to MV Danica Joy 1 whose route is from Dapitan - Dumaguete. However, her hull was painted as "MV Danica Joy". Thus, she got the name "MV Danica Joy" and her predecessor was named into "MV Danica Joy 1".

On her maiden voyage to the said route, she was called as the "Hepe De Viaje" (Chavacano term for "Chief of the Cruise") as she spearheaded the Zamboanga City - Sandakan route. In 1998, she was alongside MV Lady Mary Joy 2 in servicing the route up until MV Lady Mary Joy 2's retirement in 2006. Since then, she was the only ferry that servicing the said route.

Other shipping lines tried to compete over Aleson for the said route like Weesam Express, but it didn't last long. In 2015, MV Danica Joy was the only ship to serve that route.

Fate 
September 22, 2016 when, MV Danica Joy arrived to Zamboanga International Seaport by 4 p.m. coming from Sandakan. After all passengers had already disembarked hours, the ship listed on its starboard side and capsized by around 9:30 PM. The ship was carrying 799 passengers of which 11 Malaysians and one Australian—and 603 deportees. Luckily, all passengers were unloaded earlier on, resulting to no casualties.

The Philippine Coast Guard cited cargo mishandling caused a ferry to capsize. Commodore Pablo Gonzales Jr., PCG district commander for Southwestern Mindanao, said initial investigation showed no other safety issue on the MV Danica Joy, which capsized while berthed at the port.

Gonzales said the Coast Guard has called up the management of the MV Danica Joy to shed light on the mishap. He said the responsibility remains with the chief mate, being the cargo officer.

Gonzales explained that chief is supposed to be around until the loading or unloading of the cargo is done. He said, “We called on the management of the ship and let’s be fair with them. We have to find out if the chief mate was around and what were the procedures that he might have overlooked,”.

The chief mate may lose his license if found to have neglected his duties. Aleson Shipping also faces sanctions, he said.

The ship cargoes were capsized along with the ferry. Mostly shopping goods cargo consisting mostly of cooking oil, noodles and other food items.

See also 
 List of maritime disasters in the Philippines

References 

1982 ships
Ships built in Japan
Ferries of the Philippines
Maritime incidents in the Philippines
Maritime incidents in 2016